Ernest Eugene Oravetz (January 24, 1932 – December 3, 2006) was an American professional baseball player. A switch-hitting outfielder who threw left-handed, he played two seasons of Major League Baseball with the – Washington Senators. He was born in Johnstown, Pennsylvania.

He never hit more than two home runs in any professional season, but he batted .311 during his minor league career and in 1951, his first year as a pro, he led the Class D Florida State League in batting (.362) and runs scored (122) and was named to the All-Star team.

He collected 105 hits, with eight doubles and three triples, in 188 games played with Washington over two full seasons. He was sent to the minor leagues for good after the 1956 campaign. Oravetz then played his final seven pro seasons in the high minors, mostly in the Senators/Minnesota Twins organization.

Ernie Oravetz died in Tampa, Florida, where he had settled after his baseball career was over, at the age of 74.

References

External links
Career statistics from Baseball Reference

1932 births
2006 deaths
Baseball players from Pennsylvania
Burials at Florida National Cemetery
Charlotte Hornets (baseball) players
Chattanooga Lookouts players
Major League Baseball outfielders
Orlando Senators players
Sportspeople from Johnstown, Pennsylvania
Spokane Indians players
Baseball players from Tampa, Florida
Syracuse Chiefs players
Washington Senators (1901–1960) players